Jörg Schmadtke (born 16 March 1964) is a German football manager. The former coach and goalkeeper works as managing director sport for VFL Wolfsburg, after being vorstand sport at 1. FC Köln.   He played for Fortuna Düsseldorf (until 1993), SC Freiburg (1993–1997) and Bayer 04 Leverkusen (1997–98), all together 266 games in the German Bundesliga. Schmadtke was involved three times in improving the financial and sports situation of a club considerably.

Playing career
After A-levels Schmadtke started to study mechanical engineering, later he switched to business administration, but did not complete both. From 1985 to 1993 he played for Fortuna Düsseldorf, from 1993 until 1997 for SC Freiburg, and in the 1997–98 season for Bayer Leverkusen. He played 266 games in the Bundesliga and received nine yellow and one red card. Schmadtke played 106 games in the 2. Bundesliga, with two yellow cards. In September 1998, he helped out a couple of weeks at Borussia Mönchengladbach but did not play.

Managerial career
In December 2001, Schmadtke started working as sporting director at Aachen which had four million Euro debt and were in danger of losing the license. He was able to build up the team and scouting. In the 2004–05 season, Alemannia Aachen reached the German Cup final. The following season, the team earned promotion into the first league. The club prospered financially. In October 2008 he announced to not renew his contract which ran until 2009, and was released from work the next day. Coach Dieter Hecking said that Schmadtke knew every player from the first down to the fourth tier. Transfers included Erik Meijer, Simon Rolfes, Jan Schlaudraff, Vedad Ibisevic.

From summer 2009 up to June 2013, Schmadtke worked as sporting director of Hannover 96. In 2011, his contract was changed to an indefinite contract, and he joined the executive board as "Geschäftsführer Sport". Hannover had a few very successful seasons, both from a sports perspective (they reached the fourth position in the league and played in the UEFA cup), as well as financially. For private reasons, Schmadtke reduced his workload and also took a couple of weeks timeout in 2012. In April 2013, he asked to terminate his contract. Transfers included Didier Ya Konan, Mohammed Abdellaoue, Lars Stindl, Emanuel Pogatetz, Ron-Robert Zieler, Mame Diouf.

After being in short talks with Hamburger SV, he started to work as Co-CEO sports for 1. FC Köln ltd in June 2013. Köln managed to be promoted in the Bundesliga and to improve its sports and financial status since then every year. In April 2017, Schmadtke and Wehrle signed a contract extension until 2023. Transfers included Dominique Heintz, Anthony Modeste, Leonardo Bittencourt, Marco Höger, Jorge Meré.

In 2011 and 2017, Schmadtke received the "manager of the year" award.

He resigned on 23 October 2017.

On 22 May 2018, VfL Wolfsburg announced through Twitter the hiring of Schmadtke as the club's new Director of Sport. He was slated to start on 1 July, however on 1 June, VfL Wolfsburg announced on its web page that he was able to start immediately, thanks to a negotiation between 1. FC Köln and VfL Wolfsburg.  It was reported in papers that Wolfsburg paid a half-million Euro to Köln to lift the occupational ban that was set on Schmadtke, thus allowing him to work one month earlier than originally planned.

Personal life
Schmadtke is married to Andrea and the couple have a son, Nils. He played as goalkeeper in the 2. Bundesliga and is now working as scout for 1. FC Köln.

References

External links

1964 births
Living people
Footballers from Düsseldorf
German footballers
Association football goalkeepers
Bundesliga players
2. Bundesliga players
Fortuna Düsseldorf players
SC Freiburg players
Alemannia Aachen managers
Bayer 04 Leverkusen players
Borussia Mönchengladbach players
German football managers
VfL Wolfsburg non-playing staff
Hannover 96 non-playing staff